Kevin Buzzacott (born 1947), often referred to as Uncle Kev as an Aboriginal elder, is an Indigenous Australian from the Arabunna nation in northern South Australia. He has campaigned widely for cultural recognition, justice and land rights for Aboriginal people, and has initiated and led numerous campaigns including against uranium mining at Olympic Dam, South Australia on Kokatha land, and the exploitation of the water from the Great Artesian Basin.

Awards

In 2001 Buzzacott was awarded the prestigious Nuclear-Free Future Award, in Ireland, which provided him with an opportunity to travel to Europe and speak to supporters of Indigenous land rights.

The Australian Conservation Foundation awarded Buzzacott the 2007 Peter Rawlinson Award for two decades of work highlighting the impacts of uranium mining and promoting a nuclear free Australia. ACF executive director Don Henry describing him in the award citation as

A passionate and effective advocate for sustainable water management and for responsibility, respect and recognition of the rights, aspirations and traditional knowledge of Australia’s Indigenous peoples. Kevin is a cultural practitioner, an activist, an advocate and an educator. He has travelled tirelessly, talking to groups large and small about the impacts of uranium mining and the threats posed by the nuclear industry. Kevin has had a profound impact on the lives of many people – especially young people – with his many tours and "on-country" events. For many young activists "Uncle Kev" is truly an unsung hero and, against the current pro-nuclear tide, his is a very important struggle and story.

Campaigns

In April 1999, the Minister for Foreign Affairs, Alexander Downer, and the Minister for the Environment, Robert Hill, formally refused to pursue the World Heritage listing of Lake Eyre, instead allowing a mining company, BHP Billiton to commence mining operations.  The appellant, Buzzacott, claimed that Downer's failure to pursue World Heritage listing amounted to genocide against his people. Nulyarimma v Thompson was heard in the Federal Court of Australia and was decided in favour of the Government.

Buzzacott initiated a peace walk from Lake Eyre to the 2000 Olympic Games in Sydney, and another from the Olympic Dam uranium mine to Hiroshima, Japan.

In 2002 Buzzacott reclaimed his tribe's emu and kangaroo totems used in the Australian coat of arms from outside Parliament House, Canberra.  He was arrested three years later at the Aboriginal Tent Embassy for theft of the coat of arms. This resulted in a lengthy court battle where he served the government with a counter writ on charges of genocide.

In 2003 the Special Broadcasting Service and the Australian Film Commission Indigenous Unit produced a documentary called We of Little Voice in the "Australia By Numbers" series, which featured Buzzacott on a journey through northern South Australia to hear the stories of Aboriginal elders who have experienced the effects of the nuclear industry, from uranium mining to nuclear testing.

He has given support to the Aboriginal Tent Embassy in Canberra, where he lit the Fire for Justice in 1998. He was also involved in Camp Sovereignty at the 2006 Commonwealth Games in Melbourne, referred to by many indigenous people as the Stolen-wealth Games.

In Melbourne on 21 April 2007 a group of non-indigenous and indigenous supporters raised money in support of his efforts to raise awareness about uranium mining issues.

In February 2012, Buzzacott legally challenged the Commonwealth Environment Minister Tony Burke's environmental approval of the Olympic Dam mine expansion. Environmental approval had been granted by state and federal governments in October 2011. Buzzacott was represented by the Environmental Defenders' Office and appeared in the Federal Court in Adelaide on 3 and 4 April 2012. His challenge was unsuccessful and was dismissed on 20 April. An appeal of the judge's decision in 2013 was also unsuccessful.

Documentary films 
Buzzacott has featured in several documentary films, including First Fleet Back (2005), Near and Far (in production) and shorts by filmmakers including Jessi Boylan and Pip Starr.

References

External links
 Keepers of Lake Eyre website
 Short video of Uncle Kev in action by Pip Starr
 Tall Storeez
 Cuttlefish Country , a documentary film by Danimations

1947 births
Living people
Australian indigenous rights activists
Australian anti-uranium activists
Australian environmentalists